Odostomia chordata is a species of sea snail, a marine gastropod mollusk in the family Pyramidellidae, the pyrams and their allies.

References

 Suter, H. (1908). Result of dredging for Mollusca near Cuvier Island, with descriptions of new species. Transactions of the New Zealand Institute. 40: 344–359
 Maxwell, P.A. (2009). Cenozoic Mollusca. pp 232–254 in Gordon, D.P. (ed.) New Zealand inventory of biodiversity. Volume one. Kingdom Animalia: Radiata, Lophotrochozoa, Deuterostomia. Canterbury University Press, Christchurch.
 Spencer, H.G., Marshall, B.A. & Willan, R.C. (2009). Checklist of New Zealand living Mollusca. pp 196–219. in: Gordon, D.P. (ed.) New Zealand inventory of biodiversity. Volume one. Kingdom Animalia: Radiata, Lophotrochozoa, Deuterostomia. Canterbury University Press, Christchurch.

External links
 To World Register of Marine Species
 Spencer H.G., Willan R.C., Marshall B.A. & Murray T.J. (2011). Checklist of the Recent Mollusca Recorded from the New Zealand Exclusive Economic Zone

chordata
Gastropods described in 1908